Ilmer Halt railway station was a former halt on the Great Western and Great Central Joint Railway serving the village of Ilmer in Buckinghamshire.

History
The Great Western & Great Central Joint Committee was created on 1 August 1899 with the dual objective of providing the Great Central Railway with a second route into London, bypassing the Metropolitan Railway; and of providing the Great Western Railway with a shorter route to the Midlands.

The line ran from Northolt Junction to Ashendon Junction; the central section of its route was an existing GWR line. North of  a new line was constructed, which opened for goods on 20 November 1905, and for passengers on 2 April 1906.

The station was closed in 1963. The halt was demolished and little remains.

Route

Notes

References

External links
The station on navigable 1946 O. S. map
Pictures of the line today including Ilmer Halt

Disused railway stations in Buckinghamshire
Former Great Western and Great Central Joint Railway stations
Railway stations in Great Britain opened in 1929
Railway stations in Great Britain closed in 1963